"Isn't It Time" is a song that was performed by the English group The Babys in 1977 and was released on their album Broken Heart.

Background

"Isn't It Time" was not written by members of the group but by bass guitarist Jack Conrad along with Ray Kennedy and was presented to the public as a song with a distinctive piano introduction performed by Michael Corby which moves into an opening vocal performance by lead singer John Waite.

The strong vocals of the three Babettes from Andraé Crouch & The Disciples, Lisa Freeman-Roberts, Myrna Matthews and Pat Henderson, balance the tone of the song which moves through the decisions a lover has to make "I just can't find the answers to the questions that keep going through my mind" and "losing this love could be your mistake." The lyrics were motivated by Ray Kennedy's love for a French woman whom he knew during the writing of the song.

The drum work of Tony Brock heralds the chorus featuring the Babettes and the guitar of Walt Stocker brings the song to a close with the Babettes chorus heard alternatively in the left and right channels "isn't it time", "don't have to wait" a result of the production work of Ron Nevison. The song peaked at position No. 13 on the Billboard Hot 100 but hit No. 8 on Cash Box's Top 100. It was a #1 hit in Australia in March 1978.

On 7 December 1977 a video of the Babys' "Isn't It Time" was aired on the ABC program American Bandstand.

Chart performance

Weekly charts

Year-end charts

Certifications

Cover versions
 The song's co-writer Ray Kennedy recorded "Isn't It Time" for his 1980 self-titled album.
 English guitarist Robin Trower also recorded a cover of "Isn't It Time" for his 1990 album In the Line of Fire.
 Franco-Belgian singer Johnny Hallyday recorded a cover in 1978, Le cœur comme une montagne for the album Hollywood. (fr)
 Belgian singer Udo Mechels had a number one hit in 2006 with his cover.

References

External links
 Website of Raymond Louis Kennedy
 Denise Sullivan's Review at All Music Guide
 

1977 singles
The Babys songs
Songs written by Raymond Louis Kennedy
Song recordings produced by Ron Nevison
1977 songs
Chrysalis Records singles
Number-one singles in Australia
Songs written by Jack Conrad